Gordon Lownds (born 1947/48), co-Founder of Sleep Country Canada and Listen Up! Canada, is a successful Canadian entrepreneur.

Gord Lownds was born and raised in Toronto, Ontario, Canada. He earned a Bachelor of Arts degree in Philosophy from York University and an MBA from the University of Toronto.
In an interview with Business Edge News Magazine, Lownds describes his early career, "I started working at 15 as a barker at a carnival, and found out at that point that I enjoyed working. I was also a professional rock musician for a couple of years, playing bass and guitar. Then, I started my legitimate business career with Consumers Distributing in 1970 in a warehouse and worked my way up to the management team there."

He moved towards work in consulting and investment banking. He managed the strategic management practice at DMR & Associates. Later Lownds became a partner at Paradigm Consulting Inc. In 1988, he left that company to start Kenrick Capital, a boutique investment banking firm, with a few other partners. In 1994, he co-founded Sleep Country Canada with Christine Magee and Stephen K. Gunn. He assumed the chairman and CEO position of that company for four years and saw the chain grow from nothing to over 50 stores across Canada.
After leaving Sleep Country Canada in 1998 he spent a year traveling around Costa Rica and the Cayman Islands. In 2000, he developed and funded Red Apple Entertainment. In 2003, he co-founded Listen Up! Canada, a hearing aid retailer. In 2013, he bought a mansion in Hillsborough County, Florida and subsequently produced and filmed a reality television show about strippers there.

Gordon is a member of the University of Waterloo Stratford Campus Advisory Board.

External links 
Ex-mattress king enjoying new challenge

References

1947 births
Businesspeople from Toronto
Canadian company founders
Living people
University of Toronto alumni
York University alumni